Corythucha floridana, the Florida oak lace bug, is a species of lace bug in the family Tingidae that is associated with oak trees.

Description

References

Tingidae
Insects described in 1909
Hemiptera of North America